Bid Korpeh or Bidkorpeh, also rendered as Bidkarih, may refer to:
 Bid Korpeh-ye Olya
 Bid Korpeh-ye Sofla
 Bid Korpeh-ye Vosta